The Netherlands women's national bandy team represents the Netherlands in the sport of bandy. The team is controlled by the Bandy Bond Nederland.

The Netherlands took part in the first ever tournament for women’s national teams, held in Örebro, Sweden, in 1980. However, their debut in the Women's Bandy World Championship wasn’t made until the 2022 Women's Bandy World Championship. The team finished in 5th place.

Tournament record

World Championship
 2022 – Finished in 5th place

References 

National bandy teams
Bandy
Bandy in the Netherlands